Mary Nuzum Dolim (August 15, 1925 – January 15, 2002) was a Kansas-born American children's writer. She published four books and penned several articles and short stories. Mary Dolim was noted for writing about the Southern United States and for writing about career women in the 1960s.

Mary Dolim was married to Abel Dolim (1922–2012), an airplane navigator who later became a builder, with whom she had a son and a daughter. They lived in the San Francisco East Bay Area.

Books
 Bishop Pattern (New York: Morrow), 1963
 Also published as The Ruling Family (New York: Avon Books), 1963
 Miss Mac (Princeton, NJ: Van Nostrand), 1963
 The Omen (New York: Morrow), 196?
 Four Hands for Mercy (New York: Grosset & Dunlap), 1965, with Gen Kakacek

References

External links

 Mary N. Dolim at Goodreads
 Mary N. Dolim at Open Library
 Dolim, Mary N. (1925-2002) at the Howard Gotlieb Archival Research Center

1925 births
2002 deaths
American children's writers
American women novelists
Writers from Kansas
Writers from the San Francisco Bay Area
20th-century American novelists
20th-century American women writers
American women children's writers